This article is a catalog of actresses and models who have appeared on the cover of Harper's Bazaar Poland, the Polish edition of Harper's Bazaar magazine, starting with the magazine's first issue in March 2013.

2013

2014

2015

2016

2017

2018

2019

External links
 
 Harper's Bazaar Poland on Models.com

Poland